Shadow of the Noose is a BBC television legal drama series about the life and career of barrister Sir Edward Marshall Hall. It starred Jonathan Hyde as Marshall Hall; Michael Feast as his clerk, Edgar Bowker; Leslee Udwin as Henriette Marshall Hall; and Terry Taplin as solicitor Arthur Newton. All eight episodes were written by Richard Cooper, produced by Colin Tucker, and first transmitted between 1 March and 19 April 1989 on BBC Two. It was a co-production with the Australian Broadcasting Corporation and Television New Zealand.

Main cast
 Jonathan Hyde as Edward Marshall Hall
 Michael Feast as Edgar Bowker
 Leslee Udwin as Henriette Marshall Hall
 Terry Taplin as Arthur Newton
 Trevor Ray as Harry Bishop 
 Julian Firth as Wellesley Orr
 Gary Files as Mr. Justice Wills 
 Phil McCall as Mr. Jackson, Judge's Clerk
 Richard Moore as Sir Charles Matthews

Episode list

Tie-in novel
A novel by Cooper, also called Shadow of the Noose, was published at the time the series was transmitted. The narrative of the novel mainly comprises a vast expansion of the story of Marshall Hall's first marriage to Ethel and her subsequent death, as featured in Gone for a Soldier. The book ends with the Marie Hermann case from An Alien Shore.

Home media
Although the complete series was never released on commercial home video, An Alien Shore and Gun in Hand appeared on Vol. 1 Nos. 3 and 8 of BBC Video World, a fortnightly subscription-only service, primarily for expatriates, issued in May and July 1989 respectively. The complete series was released on DVD in early 2017.

References

External links

1980s British drama television series
1980s British legal television series
1980s British television miniseries
1989 British television series debuts
1989 British television series endings
BBC television dramas
English-language television shows
Television series set in the 1890s
Television shows set in London